Gable is an unincorporated community in Clarendon County, South Carolina, United States. Gable has a post office with ZIP code 29051, which opened on June 6, 1916.

Education
The community formerly had two all-white public high schools: Gable High School & Black River High School.

Gable High School had first opened in the Fall of 1934, & dissolved following the end of the 1948-1949 school year when it consolidated with New Zion, South Carolina's Salem High School to create Black River High School.

Black River High School had first opened in the Fall of 1949, & it dissolved following the end of the 1951-1952 school year when it consolidated with Turbeville High School to create East Clarendon High School. Their school mascot was the alligator.

Both of these schools had offered baseball, boys & girl's basketball & football as sports.

References
https://www.ancestry.com/imageviewer/collections/1265/images/sid_29321521516_1942_0009?ssrc=&backlabel=Return
https://www.ancestry.com/imageviewer/collections/1265/images/sid_29321521517_1951_0005?ssrc=&backlabel=Return
https://www.newspapers.com/image/668818634/?terms=gable%20high%20school&match=1
https://www.newspapers.com/image/748918321/?terms=black%20river%20high%20school&match=1

Unincorporated communities in Clarendon County, South Carolina
Unincorporated communities in South Carolina